The Cottian Alps are a mountain range in the southwestern part of the Alps. They form the border between France (Hautes-Alpes and Savoie) and Italy (Piedmont). The Fréjus Road Tunnel and Fréjus Rail Tunnel between Modane and Susa are important transportation arteries between France (Lyon, Grenoble) and Italy (Turin).

Etymology 

The name Cottian comes from Marcus Julius Cottius, a king of the tribes inhabiting that mountainous region in the 1st century BC. Under his father Donnus, these tribes had previously opposed but later made peace with Julius Caesar. Cottius was succeeded by his son Gaius Julius Donnus II (reigned 3 BC-4 AD), and his grandson Marcus Julius Cottius II (reigned 5-63 AD), who was granted the title of king by the emperor Claudius. On his death, Nero annexed his kingdom as the province of Alpes Cottiae.

History 
For a long part of the Middle Ages the Cottian Alps were divided between the Duchy of Savoy, which controlled their northern part and the easternmost slopes, and the Dauphiné, which at the time was independent from France. The Dauphins also held, in addition to the southwestern slopes of the range (Briançon and Queyras, now on the French side), the upper part of some of the valleys that were tributaries of the Po River (Valle di Susa, Chisone valley, Varaita Valley). The Alpine territory of Dauphiné, known as Escartons, used to have a limited autonomy and elected its own parliament. This semi-autonomous status lasted also after the annexation of the Dauphiné to France (1349), and was only abolished in 1713 due to the Treaty of Utrecht, which assigned to the House of Savoy all the mountainous area on the eastern side of the Cottian Alps.

After the treaty annexing Nice and Savoy to France, signed in Turin in March 1860 (Treaty of Turin), the north-western slopes of the range became part of the French republic.

Two eastern valleys of the Cottian Alps (Pellice and Germanasca) have been for centuries a kind of sanctuary for the Waldensians, a Christian movement that was persecuted as heretical from the 12th century onwards by the catholic church.

Geography 
Administratively the range is divided between the Italian province of Cuneo and the Metropolitan City of Turin (the eastern slopes), and the French departments of Savoie, Hautes-Alpes, and Alpes-de-Haute-Provence (the western slopes).

The Cottian Alps are drained by the rivers Durance and Arc and their tributaries on the French side; and by the Dora Riparia and other tributaries of the Po on the Italian side.

Borders 
The borders of the Cottian Alps are (clockwise):
 the Maddalena Pass to the south, which connects the Cottian Alps with the Maritime Alps;
 the Ubayette Valley, the Ubaye Valley, the Serre-Ponçon Lake, the high Durance Valley, and the Guisane Valley to the southwest;
 the Col du Galibier to the west, which connects the Cottian Alps with the Dauphiné Alps;
 the Valloirette Valley, the Maurienne Valley, and the Chardoux Creek to the northwest;
 the Mont Cenis Pass to the north, which connects the Cottian Alps with the Graian Alps;
 Mont Cenis Lake, the Cenischia Valley, the Dora Riparia Valley, the Po Plain, and the Varaita Valley to the east.

Peaks

The chief peaks of the Cottian Alps are:

Passes

The chief passes of the Cottian Alps are:

See also
 Alpes Cottiae (the original Roman province)
 Cottii Regnum
 Cottius
 Donnus
 Ambin group

Maps
 Italian official cartography (Istituto Geografico Militare – IGM); on-line version: www.pcn.minambiente.it
 French official cartography (Institut Géographique National – IGN); on-line version: www.geoportail.fr

References
  Statistics on the Cottian Alps are listed in tables on pages 741 and 742.

Mountain ranges of the Alps
Mountain ranges of Auvergne-Rhône-Alpes
Mountain ranges of Provence-Alpes-Côte d'Azur
Mountain ranges of Italy
Mountain ranges of Piedmont